The 2018–19 SK Sturm Graz season started on 21 July 2018 in the Austrian Cup against Siegendorf.

Bundesliga

Bundesliga review

July and August
Sturm Graz opened their Bundesliga campaign against TSV Hartberg on 28 July 2018. Sturm Graz won the match 3–2. Lukas Spendlhofer, Markus Pink, and Philipp Hosiner scored for Sturm Graz. Tasos Avlonitis scored an own goal and Dario Tadić scored for Hartsberg. Matchday two took place on 4 August 2018 against Wacker Innsbruck. Sturm Graz won the match 3–2. Sturm Graz got two goals from Lukas Grozurek and a goal from Markus Pink. Martin Harrer scored two goals for Wacker Innsbruck. Matchday three happened on 12 August 2018. SKN St. Pölten won the match 2–0 with goals from Daniel Luxbacher and Taxiarchis Fountas.

September and October

Results summary

Bundesliga results

Austrian Cup

Austrian Cup review
Sturm Graz opened up their 2018–19 season in the first round of the Austrian Cup against Siegendorf. Sturm Graz won the match 2–0 with goals from Markus Pink and Stefan Hierländer.

Austrian Cup results

Europe

European review
Sturm Graz were drawn against AFC Ajax in the second qualifying round draw. On 25 July 2018, Ajax won the first leg 2–0 with goals from Hakim Ziyech and Lasse Schöne. Ajax won 3–1 in the second leg on 1 August 2018 and 5–1 on aggregate. André Onana scored an own goal for Sturm Graz. Ajax got two goals from Klaas-Jan Huntelaar and a goal from Dušan Tadić.

Sturm Graz entered the third qualifying round of the Europa League after losing 5–1 on aggregate to Ajax in the second qualifying round of Champions League. Sturm Graz were drawn against the winner of the AEK Larnaca–Dundalk tie. AEK Larnaca won the tie 4–0 on aggregate. AEK Larnaca won the first leg 2–0 with goals from Joan Guillem Truyols and Ivan Tričkovski. Stefan Hierländer was sent–off during the match. An assistant referee was hit by a mug during the match. In the second leg, AEK Larnaca won the match 5–0 with three goals from Ivan Tričkovski and a goal from the penalty mark from Jorge Larena and a goal from Florian Taulemesse. With the loss, Sturm Graz were knocked out of the Europa League 7–0 on aggregate.

European results

References

Sturm Graz
Sturm Graz
Sturm Graz
2018-2019